Abortion in Andorra is illegal in all cases; the Co-Princes of Andorra are the President of France and the Bishop of Urgell, who is required to adhere to Roman Catholic teaching on pregnancy.  In terms of religious affiliation in Andorra, around 88% of its population identifies as Roman Catholic.

Andorra and Malta are the only European countries where abortion is illegal.  However, under the double effect principle in Catholic medical ethics, an intervention which would unintentionally cause the death of an unborn child is permitted where this would save the life of a pregnant woman (for example, in the ending of an ectopic pregnancy).

Law on abortion
The Constitution of Andorra states:

The Penal Code (Code Pénal) prohibits a number of offences against prenatal human life (contre la vie humaine prénatale) alongside offences against independent human life after birth (contre la vie humaine indépendante).  Article 107 states, in relation to forced abortion:

Article 108 outlaws abortion with consent:

Article 109 adds:

Article 120 protects the unborn child from other forms of assault:

The law has no explicit exceptions to its prohibitions.

Proposals
The Stop Violències movement led by the psychologist Vanessa Mendoza Cortés campaigns against gender-based violence and for the legislation of abortion in Andorra.

In 2018, Pope Francis intervened in the debate by stating that the approval of any legalisation would result in the abdication of Bishop Joan Enric Vives Sicília as Co-Prince.

Statistics
Women in Andorra who choose to terminate a pregnancy usually travel to either neighboring Spain or France where abortion is widely available. In 2021, Andorra had a population of around 79,000 people with around 500 live births taking place in the country each year.

References
 

Law of Andorra
Health in Andorra
Abortion in Europe
Andorra